M. A. Majed was a doctor and adviser, with the rank of minister, of Shahabuddin Ahmed caretaker government.

Career
Majed was the principal of the Dhaka Medical College and Hospital. He served as the dean of the school of medicine at University of Dhaka. He had served as the president of Bangladesh Medical Association three times. He was an important leader of the pro-democracy movement of doctors against President Hussain Mohammad Ershad.

Death
Majed died on 9 July 2017.

References

2017 deaths
Advisors of Caretaker Government of Bangladesh
Bangladeshi physicians
Academic staff of the University of Dhaka
Academic staff of Dhaka Medical College and Hospital